NTV Plus Sport was Russia's first dedicated sports channel. It is a part of the NTV Plus network. Replaced by Match! Planeta

External links 
Official Site

Defunct television channels in Russia
Russian-language television stations
Television channels and stations established in 1996
Television channels and stations disestablished in 2016
Sports television networks in Russia
1996 establishments in Russia
2016 disestablishments in Russia